In the video game industry, 2022 saw the lingering effects of the COVID-19 pandemic on the industry, slowing hardware sales for most of the year as well as development delays for major titles. The industry continued its trend of acquisitions and mergers, highlighted by Microsoft announcing its plan to acquire Activision Blizzard for nearly $69 billion. The industry as a whole still dealt with issues such as workplace harassment and discrimination, as well as crunch periods, leading to at least the quality assurance staff at three separate studios to vote to unionize.

Production of the ninth generation consoles, the PlayStation 5 and Xbox Series X/S, remained constrained for the first part of the year, but eased up later in the year. New hardware trends included the widespread availability of graphics cards with real-time ray tracing, increasing realism fidelity in some games, and the release of the Steam Deck by Valve, a handheld personal computing device capable of playing most games available on Steam. The gaming community remained cautious on the metaverse and blockchain games, though leading publishers expressed their desires to move more into that space.

Top-rated games

Major awards
{|class="wikitable" style="border:none; margin:0; width:100%; font-size: 90%;"
! colspan="2" style="width:16%;"| Category/Organization
!! style="width:14%;"| 26th Japan Game Awards
!! style="width:14%;"| The Game Awards 2022
!! style="width:14%;" | 12th Annual New York Game Awards
!! style="width:14%;" | 26th Annual D.I.C.E. Awards
!! colspan="2" style="width:14%;" | 23rd Game Developers Choice Awards
!! style="width:14%;" | 19th British Academy Games Awards
|-
! scope="row" colspan="2" | Game of the Year 
| colspan="4" | Elden Ring || colspan="2" | ||  
|-
! scope="row" colspan="2" | Mobile / Portable Game 
| rowspan="7"  || colspan="3" | Marvel Snap  || rowspan="2" colspan="3" 
|-
! scope="row" colspan="2" | VR / AR Game 
| colspan="2" | Moss: Book II || Red Matter 2|-
! scope="row" colspan="2" | Art Direction 
| Elden Ring ||  || God of War Ragnarök || colspan="2" | || 
|-
! scope="row" rowspan="2" style="width:9%;" | Audio || Music
| God of War Ragnarök || Metal: Hellsinger || God of War Ragnarök || rowspan="2" colspan="2" |  || 
|-
! scope="row" | Sound Design
| God of War Ragnarök ||  || God of War Ragnarök ||  
|-
! scope="row" rowspan="2" | Character or Performance || Leading Role
| rowspan="2" | Christopher Judge as KratosGod of War Ragnarök || rowspan="2" | Manon Gage as Marissa MarcelImmortality || rowspan="2" | KratosGod of War Ragnarök || colspan="2" rowspan="2"  || 
|-
! scope="row" | Supporting Role
| 
|-
! scope="row" rowspan="2" style="width:9%;" | Direction || Game Design 
| rowspan="2" | Inscryption || rowspan="2" | Elden Ring || rowspan="2"  || Elden Ring || rowspan="2" colspan="2" |  || rowspan="2" | 
|-
! scope="row" | Game Direction
| Elden Ring|-
! scope="row" colspan="2" | Narrative
| rowspan="2"  || colspan="3" | God of War Ragnarök || colspan="2" | || 
|-
! scope="row" colspan="2" | Multiplayer / Online
| Splatoon 3 ||  || Final Fantasy XIV: Endwalker || colspan="2" | || 
|-
! scope="row" rowspan="2" colspan="2" | Special Award || Special Award || rowspan="2"  || Andrew Yoon Legend Award || Hall of Fame || width=7% | Pioneer Award || width=7% | Lifetime Achievement || BAFTA Fellowship
|-
|  || Phil Spencer || Tim Schafer || Mabel Addis || John Romero || Shuhei Yoshida
|}

Critically acclaimed games
Metacritic is an aggregator of video game journalism reviews. It generally considers expansions and re-releases as separate entities.

Financial performance
According to market research firm Newton, the global video game industry had total revenues of $184.4 billion, about a 4% decline year-to-year. Half of that was from mobile games, while console games, computer games, and browser games made up 28%, 21%, and 1% of the market, respectively.

Major events

Other events
 Ukrainian support 

During the 2022 Russian invasion of Ukraine launched in February that year, several video game developers and publishers with ties to Eastern Europe provided support for Ukrainian aid. On February 24, 11 bit studios pledged to donate all profits earned over the following seven days from This War of Mine (2014) and its downloadable content to the Ukrainian Red Cross. CD Projekt Red donated 1 million zloty (about ) to the Polish Humanitarian Action group. Embracer Group donated  to Red Cross, SOS Children's Villages, and ACT Alliance, among other charities. The Pokémon Company and Niantic announced they would donate $200K each, alongside an addition $75K raised by Niantic employees, to organisations such as GlobalGiving to provide humanitarian relief in Ukraine. In addition, Niantic announced the suspended availability of Pokémon Go, Pikmin Bloom, and Ingress in both Russia and Belarus.

Electronic Arts, Microsoft, and Activision Blizzard, among others, halted sales of physical and digital products into Russia during the conflict.  Electronic Arts announced on March 2 that it had started the process to remove the Russia national football team and Russian football clubs from its FIFA series as well as removing the Belarusian and Russian national teams and their club teams from NHL 22. In addition to preventing purchase of their games in Russia, Nintendo announced on March 9 that Advance Wars 1+2: Re-Boot Camp, a tactical war game with a faction based on Soviet-era Russia, would be indefinitely delayed due to "recent world events".

 Abortion rights support 
After the June 2022 U.S. Supreme Court ruling in Dobbs v. Jackson Women's Health Organization, which overturned Roe v. Wade and eliminated the protected right to abortion, several video game companies affirmed they would offer their employees abortion benefits, including the ability to travel to states with protected abortion rights if necessary. Such companies include Microsoft, Bethesda, Ubisoft, Devolver Digital, Daybreak Games, Naughty Dog, Insomniac, Electronic Arts, and Bungie.

Notable deaths
 January 4 – Russell Lees, 60, narrative writer for Ubisoft and the Assassin's Creed, Far Cry, and Watch Dogs series.
 January 5 – Stewart Gilray, 51, founder of Just Add Water, developer of the Oddworld series.
 February 28 – Kim Jung-ju, 54, founder of Nexon.
 March 27 – Mohammad Fahmi, 32, creator of Coffee Talk March 29 – Scott Bennie, 61, developer writer for multiple role-playing games including the Fallout series
 April 26 – Robert "Razerguy" Krakoff, 81, co-founder of Razer Inc.
 May 9 – David Ward, 75, co-founder of Ocean Software
 May – Rieko Kodama, 59, developer for Sega, including lead developer on Phantasy Star and Skies of Arcadia June 22 – Bernie Stolar, 75, former president of Sega of America, founder of Sony Computer Entertainment of America
 June – Technoblade, 23, Minecraft YouTuber
 July 15 – Robert Alan Koeneke, 62, creator of Moria August 30 – Mitsuhiro Yoshida, 61, developer of River City Ransom September 3 – Mike Fahey, 49, writer and editor of the website Kotaku October 1/2 – Rob Smith, editor and writer for PC Gamer, OXM, and PSM.
 October 12 – Tony "RSGloryAndGold" Winchester, 69, RuneScape player on Twitch
 October 14 – Jan Rabson, 68, voice actor most notable as the voice of Larry Laffer in the Leisure Suit Larry series
 October 15 – Ferret Baudoin, lead/senior game designer for multiple action-RPG games including Neverwinter Nights 2, Dragon Age 2, Fallout 4, and Fallout 76 October 29 – Ryan Karazija, 40, front man and lead singer of Low Roar, and composer of the soundtrack to Death Stranding November 10 – Kevin Conroy, 66, voice actor best known as the voice of Batman
 November 19 – Jason David Frank, 49, actor best known as the voice of the original Green and White Rangers in the Power Rangers franchise.
 December 17 – Archer Maclean, 60, developer of Commodore 64 games including Dropzone and International KarateHardware releases

Game releases

Series with new entries
Series with new installments include 2064: Read Only Memories, AI: The Somnium Files, Atelier, Azure Striker Gunvolt, Batman, Bayonetta, Bendy, Borderlands, Call of Duty, The Dark Pictures Anthology, Daymare: 1998, Digimon, Doraemon, Dragon Ball, Dungeon Fighter Online, Dying Light, Earth Defense Force, ELEX, Evil Dead: The Game, Freedom Planet, Getsu Fūma Den, God of War, Gran Turismo, Grid, Gungrave, Hello Neighbor, Horizon, Horizon Chase, Joe & Mac, JoJo's Bizarre Adventure, Kao the Kangaroo, Kirby, Kunio-kun, The King of Fighters, Lego Star Wars, Let It Die, The Lord of the Rings, Mana, Mario + Rabbids, Mario Strikers,  Monkey Island, Mystery Dungeon, Need for Speed, Nobunaga's Ambition, OlliOlli, Outlast, Overlord, PGA Tour 2K, Pocky and Rocky, Pokémon, Postal, Redout, Reigns, River City Girls, RWBY, Saints Row, Science Adventure, Shadow Warrior, Shovel Knight, Sniper Elite, Sonic the Hedgehog, Splatoon, Star Ocean, Star Trek, Tactics Ogre, Taiko no Tatsujin, Teenage Mutant Ninja Turtles, Tom Clancy's Rainbow Six, Total War, Vampire: The Masquerade, Warhammer 40,000, WWE 2K, Xenoblade Chronicles, and Yu-Gi-Oh!.

January–March

April–June

July–September

October–December

Video game-based film and television releases

Cancelled games
 The Callisto Protocol (PS4, PS5, Win, XBO, and XSX; Japan only)
 Metal Max: Wild West'' (NS, PS4)

See also
2022 in games

Notes

References

2022 in video gaming
Video games by year